The Meizu MX3 is a smartphone designed and produced by the Chinese manufacturer Meizu, which runs on Flyme OS, Meizu's modified Android operating system. It is a previous phablet model of the MX series, succeeding the Meizu MX2 and preceding the Meizu MX4. It was the first smartphone with 128 GB of internal storage.
It was unveiled on September 2, 2013 in Beijing.

History 
Rumors about Meizu releasing a new flagship device appeared after renders of the upcoming device had been leaked. According to these leaks, the MX3 was supposed to have a single circular “Home” key for navigation and a Full HD 5.1-inch display.

In August 2013, Meizu has sent out invitations for a launch event on September 2, 2013 in Beijing.

Release 

As announced, the Meizu MX3 was released at the launch event in Beijing on September 2, 2013.

Features

Flyme 

The Meizu MX3 was released with an updated version of Flyme OS, a modified operating system based on Android Jelly Bean. It features an alternative, flat design and improved one-handed usability.

Hardware and design

The Meizu MX3 features a Samsung Exynos 5410 Octa system-on-a-chip with an array of four ARM Cortex-A15 and four Cortex-A7 CPU cores, a PowerVR SGX544MP3 GPU and 2 GB of RAM.
The MX3 reaches a score of 24,780 points on the AnTuTu benchmark and is therefore almost 104% faster than its predecessor, the Meizu MX2.

The MX3 is available in five different colors (white, blue, pink, orange and green) and comes with 16 GB, 32 GB, 64 GB or 128 GB of internal storage. It was the first smartphone to feature 128 GB of internal storage at the time of the release.

The body of the MX3 measures  x  x  and weighs . It has a slate form factor, being rectangular with rounded corners.
The MX3 uses a single circular halo button on the front for navigation.

The MX3 features a 5.1-inch OGS multi-touch capacitive touchscreen display with a FHD resolution of 1080 by 1800 pixels. The pixel density of the display is 412 ppi.

In addition to the touchscreen input and the front key, the device has volume/zoom control buttons and the power/lock button on the right side, a 3.5mm TRS audio jack on the top and a microUSB (Micro-B type) port on the bottom for charging and connectivity.

The Meizu MX3 has two cameras. The rear camera has a resolution of 8 MP, a ƒ/2.0 aperture, autofocus and an LED flash.
The front camera has a resolution of 2 MP, a ƒ/2.0 aperture and just like the rear camera it is also capable of recording video with a resolution of up to 1080p30.

Reception
The MX3 received positive reviews.

Android Authority reviewed the MX3 and praised good specifications, sharp display and the attractive price.

GSMArena stated that “Meizu has delivered a solid smartphone and an interesting alternative to the mainstream Android flagships” and praised the performance of the MX3.

Android Headlines also reviewed the device and concluded that “if you’re looking for a somewhat cheaper flagship device and you have a way to get one of these, consider it, because it really is worth taking a look.”. Furthermore, Android Headlines praised the sleek body and powerful specifications of the device.

See also
 Meizu
 Meizu MX2
 Meizu MX4
 Comparison of smartphones

References

External links
 Official product page (archived) Meizu

Android (operating system) devices
Mobile phones introduced in 2013
Meizu smartphones
Discontinued smartphones